The World Group II Play-offs were four ties which involved the losing nations of the World Group II and four nations from the three Zonal Group I competitions. Nations that won their play-off ties entered the 2014 World Group, while losing nations joined their respective zonal groups.

Belgium vs. Poland

France vs. Kazakhstan

Argentina vs. Great Britain

Ukraine vs. Canada

References

See also
Fed Cup structure

World Group II Play-offs